Edinho (born 31 May 1982 in Cariacica) is a Brazilian footballer who plays as a forward for Vitória ES.

Club career

Mes Kerman and Sharjah
He played for Mes Kerman from 2008/09 to 2010/11 and then joined Al Sharjah for 2011/12. He returned to Mes for 2013/14.

Tractor
On 26 July 2014, Edinho agreed to a one-year contract with Tractor, and he signed the contract on the following day.

Al Sailiya
Edinho joined Qatar Stars League club Al Sailiya in July 2015.

Desportiva Ferroviária
Edinho joined Desportiva Ferroviária in January 2016, having previously helped them win the Serie B state title in 2007. He scored five goals for them in the 2016 championship, helping them to win the title. He was also named as one of the best players in the tournament.

Tractor
Edinho returned to former club Tractor for the 2016/17 season.

Vitória
He signed a one-year contract with Vitória-ES in July 2019, having originally played for them in 2006 when they won the Capixaba title.

References

External links
Edinho at ZeroZero

1982 births
Living people
Brazilian footballers
Brazilian expatriate footballers
Gil Vicente F.C. players
Associação Jaguaré Esporte Clube players
Vitória Futebol Clube (ES) players
Real S.C. players
Sanat Mes Kerman F.C. players
Al-Sailiya SC players
Tractor S.C. players
Desportiva Ferroviária players
Macaé Esporte Futebol Clube players
Espírito Santo Futebol Clube players
Goytacaz Futebol Clube players
UAE First Division League players
UAE Pro League players
Qatar Stars League players
Persian Gulf Pro League players
Campeonato Brasileiro Série D players
Association football forwards
Expatriate footballers in Iran
Expatriate footballers in Portugal
Expatriate footballers in Qatar
Expatriate footballers in the United Arab Emirates
Brazilian expatriate sportspeople in Iran
Brazilian expatriate sportspeople in Portugal
Brazilian expatriate sportspeople in Qatar
Brazilian expatriate sportspeople in the United Arab Emirates